Members of the New South Wales Legislative Council who served in the 48th Parliament were elected at the 1978, 1981 and 1984 elections. Members served for three terms of the Legislative Assembly, which, as a result of the 1981 referendum meant the maximum term was twelve years. The 15 members elected in 1978 did not face re-election until 1988, the 15 members elected in 1981 did not face re-election until 1992 and the 15 members elected in 1984 did not face re-election until 1996. The President was Johno Johnson.

References

Members of New South Wales parliaments by term
20th-century Australian politicians